Álvaro Rodríguez Pérez (born 22 July 1994) is a Spanish footballer who plays as a right back for Albacete Balompié.

Club career
Born in Leganés, Madrid, Rodríguez made his senior debut with EMF Moraleja de Enmedio in 2013, in the Primera Categoría (sixth division). In the following year, he moved to Tercera División team AD Parla.

In July 2016, Rodríguez joined AD Alcorcón and was immediately assigned to the B-team also in the fourth division. Roughly one year later, he moved to Fútbol Alcobendas Sport in the same category.

On 5 January 2018, Rodríguez signed for Segunda División B side CF Rayo Majadahonda. A backup to Rubén Valverde, he contributed with three appearances as his side achieved promotion to Segunda División for the first time ever, but moved to Lorca FC, which suffered administrative relegation to the fourth tier, on 18 August.

On 15 July 2019, Rodríguez agreed to a deal with Real Murcia back in the third division. The following 16 June, he joined fellow league team Burgos CF, and helped the latter side in their promotion to the second tier, now as a regular starter.

Rodríguez made his professional debut on 15 August 2021, starting in a 0–1 away draw against Sporting de Gijón. He scored his first goal as a professional on 24 October, netting his team's third in a 3–1 home win over SD Huesca.

On 19 July 2022, Rodríguez signed a two-year contract with Albacete Balompié, newly promoted to the second division.

References

External links

1994 births
Living people
People from Leganés
Spanish footballers
Footballers from the Community of Madrid
Association football defenders
Segunda División players
Segunda División B players
Tercera División players
Divisiones Regionales de Fútbol players
AD Alcorcón B players
CF Rayo Majadahonda players
Real Murcia players
Burgos CF footballers
Albacete Balompié players